Jabir ibn al-Ash'ath ibn Yahya al-Ta'i was a governor of Egypt, from 811 to 812.

He was appointed in March 811 by the caliph al-Amin, replacing Hatim ibn Harthamah ibn A'yan. Soon afterwards however he was forced to contend with the outbreak of civil war between al-Amin and his brother al-Ma'mun, and before long his continued loyalty to the former had put him at odds with a faction of the local jund led by al-Sari ibn al-Hakam, which favored recognizing al-Ma'mun as caliph instead. In the spring of 812 the jund, with the encouragement of al-Ma'mun, openly switched their allegiance and revolted, and Jabir was overthrown from his position. A partisan of al-Ma'mun, Abbad ibn Muhammad ibn Hayyan, then assumed the governorship and took up power in Fustat, but other parts of Egypt continued to remain loyal to al-Amin under the anti-governor Rabi'ah ibn Qays ibn Zubayr al-Jurashi.

Notes

References 
 
 
 

Abbasid governors of Egypt
9th-century Abbasid governors of Egypt
9th-century Arabs